Nižný Tvarožec is a village and municipality in Bardejov District in the Prešov Region of north-east Slovakia.

History
In historical records the village was first mentioned in 1355.

The village is best known in the English-speaking world as the ancestral village of the American novelist Thomas Bell (1903—1961). His popular 1941 novel Out of This Furnace is the story of three generations of a family, starting with their migration in 1881 from Austria-Hungary to the United States, and finishing with World War II. The novel's title refers to the central role of the steel mill in the family's life and in the history of the Pittsburgh region.

Geography
The municipality lies at an altitude of 420 metres and covers an area of 11.157 km².
It has a population of about 460 people.

External links
 
https://web.archive.org/web/20100202015957/http://www.statistics.sk/mosmis/eng/run.html

Villages and municipalities in Bardejov District
Šariš